Bougnard tram stop is located on line B of the Tramway de Bordeaux, and served as terminus of that line between 3 July 2004, when the line was extended from Saint-Nicolas, and 29 May 2007, when the line was extended to Pessac Centre. The stop is located on Aavenue Bougnard in the commune of Pessac and is operated by Transports Bordeaux Métropole.

To the west of Bougnard, line B divides into two branches, one running north to Pessac Centre and the other west to France Alouette. For most of the day on Mondays to Fridays, trams run at least every five minutes between the city centre and Bougnard, with services every ten minutes on the two branches. Services run less frequently in the early morning, late evenings, weekends and public holidays.

Interchange 

 Buses of the TBC:

Close by 
 Parc-relais Bougnard

References 

Bordeaux tramway stops
Tram stops in Pessac
Railway stations in France opened in 2004